The Judicial system of San Marino requires that the country's lower court judges be noncitizens, to ensure impartiality. Most lower court judges are Italian. A local conciliation judge handles cases of minor importance. Other cases are handled by non-Sammarinese judges who serve under contract to the Government. The final court of review is the Council of Twelve, a group of judges chosen for 6-year terms (four of whom are replaced every 2 years) from among the members of the Grand and General Council.

Supreme court

Lower Court

References

 
Government of San Marino